Seed of Memory is the fourth studio album by English vocalist Terry Reid, released in 1976 by ABC Records. It was produced by Graham Nash and written by Terry Reid. It was re-released in 2004. The songs "Brave Awakening", "Seed of Memory" and "To Be Treated Rite" were used in the 2005 film The Devil's Rejects. Additionally, "Faith to Arise" was featured on the soundtrack to the 2003 film Wonderland, as well as the 2019 film 3 From Hell.

Track listing
All tracks composed by Terry Reid
 "Faith to Arise" – 4:39
 "Seed of Memory" – 5:26
 "Brave Awakening" – 6:32
 "To Be Treated Rite" – 5:54
 "Ooh Baby (Make Me Feel So Young)" – 3:57
 "The Way You Walk" – 4:43
 "The Frame" – 4:37
 "Fooling You" – 7:20

Personnel
Terry Reid – guitar, vocals, harmonica
David Lindley – acoustic & slide guitar, violin
Graham Nash – harmony vocals
Plas Johnson – saxophone
Blue Mitchell – trumpet
Tim Weisberg – flute
Al Viola – balalaika
Ben Keith – pedal steel
Joel Bernstein – acoustic guitar
Jesse Erlich – cello
James Gadson – drums
Lee Miles – bass
Al Perkins – pedal steel
Soko Richardson – drums
Clifford Solomon – horn
Fred Wesley – horn
 Produced by Graham Nash and recorded at Sound Labs, Hollywood and Rudy Records, San Francisco.

References

1976 albums
Terry Reid albums
Albums produced by Graham Nash